Juliaetta is a city in Latah County, Idaho, United States. The population was 579 at the 2010 census.

History

The area was originally called Schupferville for Rupert Schupfer, an original homesteader in the area. The town was named in 1882 by the first postmaster, Charles Snyder. He named the town in honor of his two daughters, Julia and Etta. The city was incorporated in 1892 when the railroad was extended to that point.

The Bank of Juliaetta is a historic building located on Main Street. It was built in 1889 and now houses a restaurant. The building was placed on the National Register of Historic Places in 1998.

Geography

Demographics

2010 census
As of the census of 2010, there were 579 people, 263 households, and 163 families residing in the city. The racial makeup of the city was 95.7% White, 0.2% African American, 1.7% Native American, and 2.4% from two or more races. Hispanic or Latino of any race were 1.4% of the population.

There were 263 households, of which 23.6% had children under the age of 18 living with them, 47.5% were married couples living together, 9.5% had a female householder with no husband present, 4.9% had a male householder with no wife present, and 38.0% were non-families. 31.2% of all households were made up of individuals, and 12.9% had someone living alone who was 65 years of age or older. The average household size was 2.20 and the average family size was 2.72.

The median age in the city was 46.8 years. 18.7% of residents were under the age of 18; 6.8% were between the ages of 18 and 24; 22.3% were from 25 to 44; 31.5% were from 45 to 64; and 20.9% were 65 years of age or older. The gender makeup of the city was 49.2% male and 50.8% female.

2000 census
As of the census of 2000, there were 609 people, 255 households, and 175 families residing in the city. The racial makeup of the city was 96.72% White, 2.13% Native American, 0.16% Asian, and 0.99% from two or more races. Hispanic or Latino of any race were 0.82% of the population.

There were 255 households, out of which 25.5% had children under the age of 18 living with them, 56.5% were married couples living together, 9.8% had a female householder with no husband present, and 31.0% were non-families. 27.5% of all households were made up of individuals, and 14.5% had someone living alone who was 65 years of age or older.  The average household size was 2.39 and the average family size was 2.89.

In the city, the population was spread out, with 24.1% under the age of 18, 7.7% from 18 to 24, 22.8% from 25 to 44, 28.1% from 45 to 64, and 17.2% who were 65 years of age or older.  The median age was 41 years. For every 100 females, there were 106.4 males.  For every 100 females age 18 and over, there were 101.7 males.

The median income for a household in the city was $33,295, and the median income for a family was $39,250. Males had a median income of $31,875 versus $18,594 for females. The per capita income for the city was $14,606.  About 4.2% of families and 12.3% of the population were below the poverty line, including 16.7% of those under age 18 and 5.7% of those age 65 or over.

References

External links

 kendrick-juliaetta.org
 Latah County Historical Society
 Public Library
 Regional information

Cities in Idaho
Cities in Latah County, Idaho